MV Confederation is a seasonal RORO ferry service vessel which runs between Caribou, Nova Scotia and Wood Islands, Prince Edward Island from May to December. It is operated by Northumberland Ferries Limited (NFL). Built by Pictou Industries Limited for NFL and launched in Pictou, NS in 1993 Confederation has a total length of 114.2 metres, beam of 18.77m, a draft of 4.439m and a gross tonnage of 8,060. Her passenger capacity is 600 with a vehicle capacity of 220.

In 2015, she was given a new paint job, complete with the new logo of NFL.

In 2016, the other vessel on the route, MV Holiday Island was out of service for an extended length of time undergoing major repairs and overhaul leaving the Confederation alone on the ferry route for the prime summer months. Despite additional crossings scheduled for the vessel, local residents, the hospitality industry as a whole and commercial truckers protested as business suffered due to the reduction in service. Confederation was also out of service from 29 September to 2 October that year due to an electrical problem.

References

External links
 Northumberland Ferries Limited

Confederation,MV
Confederation,MV
1993 ships